The Irish Film & Television Academy (IFTA) is an all-Ireland organisation focused on film and television. It has about 1000 members, and is based in Dublin, with branches in London and Los Angeles. The IFTA now holds separate ceremonies for the IFTA Film & Drama Awards and IFTA Gala Television Awards; before 2015, they were one ceremony, known as the Irish Film & Television Awards. IFTA also holds the John Ford Ireland Symposium each June, and over 30 networking and learning events throughout the year.

IFTA also established John Ford Ireland in 2011, in association with the estate of American director John Ford and the Department of Culture, Heritage, and the Gaeltacht.

References

External links
 

 Twitter account

2003 establishments in Ireland
Arts organizations established in 2003
Cultural organisations based in the Republic of Ireland
Entertainment in Ireland
Film-related professional associations
Film organisations in Ireland
Professional associations based in Ireland
Television in Ireland